Kenneth James King (born 1940) is since September 2005 Professor Emeritus of International and Comparative Education at the University of Edinburgh. He is a historian, an Africanist and former Director of the Centre of African Studies (CAS) at Edinburgh. King obtained a Bachelor of Arts Classical Tripos from the University of Cambridge, and a Postgraduate Certificate in Education at the Institute of Education, London. He taught African History at a secondary school in Addis Abeba, Ethiopia, and earned a PhD degree in African history at the University of Edinburgh in 1968. He then worked at the University of Nairobi before returning to Edinburgh, where he was a Lecturer, Reader and Professor. In 1978 he was seconded for four years to the International Development Research Centre (IDRC) in Ottawa, Canada. 
Kenneth King and his wife Pravina King Khilnani were both presented with the 2011/2012 Distinguished Africanist Award of the African Studies Association of the United Kingdom (ASAUK). King has researched the small scale informal sector (Jua Kali) enterprises in Kenya over a 20-year period, and more recently studied India-Africa cooperation in human resource development, especially in Kenya, Ethiopia and South Africa.

Publications
Kenneth King published many journal articles, books and book chapters including:
 Pan-Africanism and Education A Study of Race, Philanthropy and Education in the United States of America and East Africa, Clarendon Press, 1971. Diasporic Africa Press, La Vergne, 2017. .
 Ras Makonnen (Author), Kenneth J. King (Editor): Pan-Africanism from Within, Oxford University Press, 1971.
 The African Artisan, Education and the Informal Sector, Heinemann, London, 1977.
 Jua kali Kenya : change & development in an informal economy 1970-1995, Ohio University Press, Athens 1996.
 with Simon A. McGrath: Enterprise in Africa : between poverty and growth, Intermediate Technology, London, 1999.
 with Simon McGrath: Globalisation, enterprise and knowledge: education, training and development in Africa, Symposium Books, Oxford, 2002.
 with Simon McGrath: Knowledge for development? Comparing British, Japanese, Swedish and World Bank aid, Zed Books, London, 2004.
 China's Aid and Soft Power in Africa : the case of education & training, James Currey, Boydell & Brewer Ltd, Woodbridge, Suffolk, 2013. African Issues, .
 Education, Skills and International Cooperation : Comparative and Historical Perspectives, Springer, Comparative Education Research Centre, The University of Hong Kong, 2019. CERC studies in comparative education 36. (A selection of King's previously published works.)
 with Meera Venkatachalam (Eds): India's Development Diplomacy and Soft Power in Africa, James Currey, Woodbridge, Suffolk, 2021.

References

External links
Sound recording:
  Sound recording. Duration 7m:24s.
Videos:
 . Kopfadeyemi Fellowship. Insights from the Research Conference of the LSE Africa Summit (London School of Economics). Duration 4m:51s. 16 May 2016.
 .  PSU African Studies. Kenneth King from the University of Edinburgh speaks on "China and India's higher education cooperation with Africa: Cultural Diplomacy and Soft Power". Duration 1h:42m:06s. 7 May 2021.

1940 births
Academics of the University of Edinburgh
Alumni of the University of Cambridge
Alumni of the University of Edinburgh
British Africanists
British historians
Living people
Academic staff of the University of Nairobi